The Peter Blazey Fellowship in an Australian literary award, in honour of the life and work of Peter Bradford Blazey (1939-1997).

Establishment of Fellowship
The Fellowship was established by Clive Blazey and Tim Herbert, respectively, brother and partner to Peter Blazey, to honour his life and work, as a journalist, author and gay activist. The Fellowship was launched by the Hon. Justice Michael Kirby at the Australia Centre, in Melbourne, on 30 April 2004.

Nature of Fellowship
The Fellowship is awarded annually to writers in the non-fiction fields of biography, autobiography and life-writing, and is intended to further a work in progress. The Fellowship comprises a monetary prize and a one-month writing residence with the Australia Centre, within the University of Melbourne.

Fellowship winners

References

Australian literary awards
Biography awards
2004 establishments in Australia